Joshua Kiprui Cheptegei (born 12 September 1996) is a Ugandan long-distance runner. He is the reigning Olympic champion in the 5000 metres and silver medalist for the 10,000 metres, a two-time 10,000 m World champion from 2019 and 2022, World silver medallist from 2017, and the 2019 World Cross Country champion. Cheptegei also won gold medals for the 5000 m and 10,000 m at the 2018 Commonwealth Games. He currently holds  world records in both disciplines and holds the world best in the 15 kilometres road race. He is also the current Ugandan record holder in both the 5 km and 10 km.

Cheptegei is the tenth man in history to hold the 5,000 m and 10,000 m world records concurrently, both set in 2020. In 2018, he set a world record in the 15 km. Two years later, at a road race in Monaco, he set a previous world road 5 km record of 12:51, breaking through the event's 13-minute barrier and taking 9 seconds from the previous best, set by Kenya's Sammy Kipketer in 2000. In August 2020, at the Monaco Diamond League meet, he set a new 5000 m world record of 12:35.36, breaking Kenenisa Bekele's 16-year-old world record of 12:37.35 set in Hengelo. On 7 October 2020, in Valencia, he set a world record time of 26:11.00 in the 10,000 metres, which again improved on Kenenisa Bekele's 15-year-old best by more than 6 seconds.

Early life
Joshua Cheptegei was born on 12 September 1996 in Kapsewui, Kapchorwa District, Uganda. In primary school, he first played football and tried out long jump and triple jump, but switched to running when he discovered his talent in distance running.

Cheptegei studied languages and literature in Kampala for two years and is employed by the Uganda National Police. His coach is Addy Ruiter. In the timeframe from March to May 2020, he reduced his weekly training sessions from 12 to 8.

Career

He is a silver medallist in the 10,000 metres at the 2017 World Championships in London. He also competed in the 10,000 metres at the 2015 World Championships in Beijing, finishing ninth. He ran at the 2016 Summer Olympics in the 5000 metres and 10,000 metres, finishing eighth and sixth respectively. Cheptegei was the 5000 metres and 10,000 metres champion at the 2018 Commonwealth Games. He won silver in the 10,000 metres and gold in the 5,000 metres at the 2020 Summer Olympics.

Cheptegei is a four-time winner of the Zevenheuvelenloop 15 km road race in Nijmegen, Netherlands. In 2018, he set the world record for a 15 km road race. Abrar Osman finished second with 42:34 and the 2017 5000 m world champion Muktar Edris placed third with 42:56. On 19 February 2022, the record was broken by Cheptegei's compatriot Jacob Kiplimo, who ran a 15 km split of 40:43 min at the Ras Al Khaimah Half Marathon.

Cheptegei was the winner of the senior men's race at the 2019 IAAF World Cross Country Championships in Aarhus, Denmark. He won in 31:40 on the 10.24 km course. Ugandan teammate Jacob Kiplimo finished second in 31:44, while Thomas Ayeko placed seventh and Joseph Ayeko tenth; Uganda won the team first-place title.

World records
On 1 December 2019, he set a new 10 km road race record in Valencia, Spain. His time of 26:38 improved on the previous world record, set by Leonard Komon in 2010, by 6 seconds.
This mark has since been lowered to 26:24, the world record being held, as of October 2020, by Rhonex Kipruto of Kenya, who also incidentally set it in Valencia just six weeks later, on 12 January 2020.

On 16 February 2020, he set a new 5 km road race world record in Monaco with a time of 12:51. The previous ratified record was 13:22, set by Robert Keter on 9 November 2019 in Lille, France, and the previous fastest time ever recorded over the distance was 13:00 set by Sammy Kipketer on 26 March 2000 in Carlsbad, USA. This record stood for nearly two years until broken by Berihu Aregawi, who ran 12:49 at the Cursa dels Nassos meet in Barcelona on 31 December 2021. 

On 13 August 2020, a day before the Herculis meet of the Diamond League in Monaco, Cheptegei announced that he aimed to return to the track and run his first official race in the season with a world record time in the 5000 metres, which would be more than 20 seconds faster than his personal best on a track. At the meet on the next day, with the help of expert pace-making from Roy Hoornweg, Stephen Kissa, and Matthew Ramsden, he set a new world record in the 5000 metres with a time of 12:35.36, which broke Kenenisa Bekele's 16-year-old record – the longest duration in the history of the event – by almost 2 seconds. His splits were 2:31.87; 5:03.77; 7:35.14 and 10:05.46. Bekele congratulated Cheptegei from Addis Ababa.

On 7 October 2020, in Valencia, he set a world record time of 26:11.00 in the 10,000 metres, which improved on Kenenisa Bekele's 15-year-old record by more than 6 seconds.

International competitions

Circuit wins and titles
 Diamond League champion 5000 metres:  2019
 2019: Eugene Prefontaine Classic in Stanford (Two miles), Zürich Weltklasse (5000 m, PB)
 2020: Monaco Herculis (5000 m)
 2021: Eugene (Two miles)
 2022: Eugene (5000 m)

References

External links

 

1996 births
Living people
People from Kapchorwa District
Ugandan male long-distance runners
Ugandan male cross country runners
Olympic male long-distance runners
Olympic athletes of Uganda
Athletes (track and field) at the 2016 Summer Olympics
World Athletics Championships athletes for Uganda
World Athletics Championships medalists
World Athletics Championships winners
Commonwealth Games gold medallists for Uganda
Athletes (track and field) at the 2018 Commonwealth Games
Commonwealth Games medallists in athletics
Diamond League winners
Commonwealth Games gold medallists in athletics
Olympic silver medalists in athletics (track and field)
Medalists at the 2020 Summer Olympics
Athletes (track and field) at the 2020 Summer Olympics
Olympic silver medalists for Uganda
Olympic gold medalists in athletics (track and field)
Olympic gold medalists for Uganda
20th-century Ugandan people
21st-century Ugandan people
World Athletics record holders
Medallists at the 2018 Commonwealth Games